The 2002 Ottawa Renegades season was the first in franchise history. It was the first time since the 1996 CFL season that the city of Ottawa had a team in the CFL. The Renegades finished 4th place in the East division with a 4–14 record and failed to make the playoffs.

Offseason

CFL Draft

Preseason

Regular season

Season Standings

Regular season

Schedule

Awards and honours
Ricky Bell, Cornerback, CFLPA All-Star
Michael Boireau, Defensive End, CFLPA All-Star
John Grace, Linebacker, CFL All-Star
John Grace, Linebacker, CFL Eastern All-Star
John Grace, Linebacker, CFLPA All-Star
Jimmy Oliver, Wide Receiver, CFL Eastern All-Star
Val St. Germain, Offensive Tackle, CFLPA Eastern All-Star
Gerald Vaughn, Halfback, CFLPA All-Star

References

External links
Ottawa Football
Ottawa football community
Official online home of Renegade Nation
CFL Historical Ottawa Renegades (Archived 2009-10-22)
Ottawa Renegades Football Journal

2002
Ottawa Renegades Season, 2002